HMS Jaguar was a J-class destroyer of the Royal Navy. Commissioned in September 1939, she was present at the Dunkirk evacuation the following year, during which Jaguar was damaged by dive bombers. She later served in the Mediterranean and was involved in several actions there. She was torpedoed off the coast of Egypt on 26 March 1942 and sunk.

Construction
The eight ships of the J class were ordered on 25 March 1937, and Jaguar was laid down at the Dumbarton shipyard of Denny on 25 November 1937. She was launched on 22 November 1938 and commissioned on 12 September 1939.

As completed, Jaguar had a main gun armament of six  QF Mark XII guns in three twin mountings, two forward and one aft. These guns could only elevate to an angle of 40 degrees, and so were of limited use in the anti-aircraft role, while the aft mount was arranged so that it could fire forwards over the ship's superstructure to maximise the forward firing firepower, but was therefore incapable of firing directly aft. A short range anti-aircraft armament of a four-barrelled 2-pounder "pom-pom" anti-aircraft mount and eight .50 in machine guns in two quadruple mounts was fitted, while torpedo armament consisted of ten  torpedo tubes in two quintuple mounts.

Service

Home waters
On commissioning, Jaguar joined the 7th Destroyer Flotilla based at Grimsby, operating off Britain's east coast. On 11 October, the ship ran aground in the Firth of Forth and was under repair until November. She was refitted at the Caledon Shipbuilding & Engineering Company's Dundee yard from 15 March 1940 to 1 May that year, with leaks being rectified and her fuel tanks modified.

On 26 May 1940, the Royal Navy set Operation Dynamo in motion, to rescue trapped British troops from Dunkirk and the surrounding area. Jaguar landed 370 troops picked up from the beaches of Bray-Dunes at Dover early on 29 May. Later that day she was ordered to embark troops from Dunkirk harbour. Jaguar and Grenade berthed side by side on the East Pier at Dunkirk. She embarked about 1000 troops before leaving the harbour at about 15:50 hr, when she was attacked by dive bombers and near missed by four bombs, which severed a steam pipe, which disabled her engines and knocking out her steering. She was towed clear of a wreck by the destroyer , which along with the coaster Rika, took off Jaguars troops. Later that day, Jaguar managed to restore power and returned to Dover under her own steam.

Jaguar was sent to the Humber for repair, returning to service on 23 June. In October 1940 she was transferred to Portsmouth, and on 11 October, took part in Operation Medium, when the destroyers of the 5th Destroyer Flotilla, including Jaguar, escorted the battleship  during a bombardment of Cherbourg harbour. From 14 October to 1 November, Jaguar was refitted at Devonport, being fitted with degaussing coils.

The Mediterranean
On 23 November 1940, Jaguar joined Force H based at Gibraltar. On 27 November, she took part in the Battle of Cape Spartivento. In January 1941, the British carried out Operation Excess, an operation to run a convoy from Gibraltar to Malta and Piraus in Greece, while simultaneously running another convoy from Alexandria to Malta. Jaguar formed part of the close escort of the convoy running eastwards from Gibraltar. At dawn on 10 January, the Italian torpedo boats  and  attacked the convoy, launching seven torpedoes, all of which missed. Gunfire from the cruiser  and the destroyers of the escort soon disabled Vega, and Jaguar closed to within  of Vega and raked her with gunfire, setting the torpedo boat ablaze before the destroyer  sank Vega with a torpedo. Jaguar fired 88 4.7 inch rounds and six 4-inch rounds during the engagement. When the operation was complete Jaguar joined the 14th Destroyer Flotilla of the Mediterranean Fleet. In later February 1941 she took part in Operation Abstention, an attempt to capture the island of Kastelorizo in the Dodecanese from the Italians. The Italians rushed reinforcements to the island, forcing the British force to evacuate. After a brief exchange of fire between the two ships, Jaguars searchlight was hit by a  round from Crispi, causing contact to be lost. That March she was at sea as part of Force D during the Battle of Cape Matapan.

On 23 April, Jaguar together with sister ships ,  and  set out from Malta to intercept an Italian convoy on the way from Italy to Tripoli. Jaguar took part in the Battle of Crete, delivering ammunition to British troops fighting on the island and escorting ships carrying out the evacuation from Crete. Jaguar was near missed by a bomb on 30 May.

After the end of the Syrian campaign, Jaguar operated out of Alexandria, duties including escorting supply convoys to besieged Tobruk, and shore bombardment duties off the coast of Libya. On 1 December 1941, her bridge was hit by a single 4.7 in shell accidentally fired by Jervis while the latter destroyer guns were being cleaned. Two men were killed, including Jaguars commanding officer. Later that month, Jaguar was deployed to Malta for operations against Italian convoys carrying supplies to North Africa. On the night of 18/19 December, three cruisers and four destroyers of Force K set out from Malta to intercept an Italian convoy, but ran into a minefield north of Tripoli, with the cruiser  striking four mines and sinking, the cruisers  and  also striking mines. The destroyer  struck a mine when trying to rescue survivors from Neptune, blowing her stern off. Early on 20 December, Jaguar found Kandahar, but the seas were too heavy for Jaguar to take Kandahar under tow, so after picking up 165 survivors from the stricken destroyer's crew, Jaguar scuttled Kandahar with torpedoes.

Jaguar helped to escort convoy MF 2 into Malta on 7–8 January 1942. She left Malta later that month, and from 13 to 16 June escorted the Malta-bound three ship Convoy MW 9, but two of the merchant ships were sunk and the third damaged and forced to put into Tobruk. Jaguar came alongside Salvol to rescue the oiler's crew, but the destroyer was then struck by two more torpedoes from U-652. Jaguar broke into three parts and quickly sank off Sidi Barrani, Egypt,  with the loss of 3 officers and 190 of her crew. 8 officers and 45 crewmen were rescued by the South African naval whaler Klo.

Notes

References

External links

 

1938 ships
Ships built on the River Clyde
J, K and N-class destroyers of the Royal Navy
Maritime incidents in March 1942
Ships sunk by German submarines in World War II
World War II destroyers of the United Kingdom
World War II shipwrecks in the Mediterranean Sea